Mermiria is a genus of slant-faced grasshoppers in the family Acrididae. There are at least four described species in Mermiria.

Species
These four species belong to the genus Mermiria:
 Mermiria bivittata (Serville, 1839) (two-striped mermiria)
 Mermiria intertexta Scudder, 1899 (eastern mermiria)
 Mermiria picta (F. Walker, 1870) (lively mermiria)
 Mermiria texana Bruner, 1889 (Texas mermiria)

References

Further reading

External links

 

Acrididae genera
Articles created by Qbugbot
Gomphocerinae